Desmidiales, commonly called desmids (Gr. desmos, bond or chain), are an order in the Charophyta, a division of green algae in which the land plants (Embryophyta) emerged. Or in other words, Desmid, (order Desmidiales), order of single-celled (sometimes filamentous or colonial) microscopic green algae. Desmids are sometimes treated as a family (Desmidiaceae) of the order Zygnematales.

The desmids belong to the class Zygnematophyceae. Although they are sometimes grouped together as a single family Desmidiaceae, most classifications recognize three to five families, either within the order Zygnematales or as their own order Desmidiales.

The Desmidiales comprise around 40 genera and 5,000 to 6,000 species, found mostly but not exclusively in fresh water. Many species may be found in the fissures between patches of sphagnum moss in marshes. With a pH level of approximately 4.0, sphagnum peat provides the ideal environment for this flora.

Morphology

The structure of these algae is unicellular, and lacks flagella. Although most desmid species are unicellular, some genera form chains of cells, called filaments. A few genera form non-filamentous colonies, with individual cells connected by threads or remnants of parent cell walls.

The cell of a desmid is often divided into two symmetrical compartments separated by a narrow bridge or isthmus, wherein the spherical nucleus is located. Each semi-cell houses a large, often folded chloroplast for photosynthesizing. One or more pyrenoids can be found. These form carbohydrates for energy storage. The cell-wall, of two halves (termed semicells), which, in a few species of Closterium and Penium, are of more than one piece, has two distinct layers, the inner composed mainly of cellulose, the outer is stronger and thicker, often furnished with spines, granules, warts et cetera. It is made up of a base of cellulose impregnated with other substances including iron compounds, which are especially prominent in some species of Closterium and Penium and is not soluble in an ammoniacal solution of copper oxide.

Desmids assume a variety of highly symmetrical and generally attractive shapes, among those elongated, star-shaped and rotund configurations, which provide the basis for their classification. The largest among them may be visible to the unaided eye.

Desmids possess characteristic crystals of barium sulphate at either end of the cell which exhibit continuous Brownian motion. The function of these crystals is completely unknown.

Many desmids also secrete translucent, gelatinous mucilage from pores in the cell wall that acts as a protecting agent. These pores are either, as in Micrasterias, uniformly distributed across the cell-wall but always appear to be absent in the region of the isthmus, or, in highly ornamented forms, as many genera of Cosmarium, grouped symmetrically around the bases of the spines, warts and so on with which the cell is provided.

In the inner layer of the wall the pore is a simple canal, but in the outer, except in Closterium, the canal is surrounded by a specially differentiated cylindrical zone, not composed of cellulose, through which the canal passes. This is termed the pore-organ. The canals are no doubt in all cases occupied by threads of mucilage in process of excretion. At the inner surface of the wall they terminate in lens- or button-shaped swellings, while from the outer end of the pore-organ there sometimes arise delicate radiating or club-shaped masses of mucilage through which the canal passes and which appear to be more or less permanent in character. In most cases, however, these are absent or only represented by small perforated buttons.

Reproduction
Desmids commonly reproduce by asexual fission, however, in adverse conditions, Desmidiales may reproduce sexually, through a process of conjugation, which are also found among the closely related Zygnematales.

Classification

Classification of the families and genera in the Desmidiales:

 Closteriaceae
 Closterium
 Spinoclosterium
 Gonatozygaceae
 Genicularia
 Gonatozygon
 Leptocystinema
 Peniaceae
 Penium

 Desmidiaceae
 Actinotaenium
 Arthrodesmus
 Bambusina
 Cosmarium
 Cosmocladium
 Desmidium
 Docidium
 Euastrum
 Groenbladia
 Haplotaenium
 Heimansia
 Hyalotheca

 Micrasterias
 Onychonema
 Phymatodocis
 Pleurotaenium
 Sphaerozosma
 Spondylosium
 Staurastrum
 Staurodesmus
 Teilingia
 Tetmemorus
 Triploceras
 Xanthidium

The family Gonatozygaceae is sometimes included within the Peniaceae, reducing the number of families from four to three. A fifth family Mesotaeniaceae was formerly included in the Desmidiales, but analysis of cell wall structure and DNA sequences show that the group is more closely related to the Zygnemataceae, and so is now placed together with that family in the order Zygnematales. However, the Zygnemataceae may have emerged in the Mesotaeniaceae.

References

Further reading
 Survey of Clare Island 1990 - 2005, noting the Desmidiales recorded. Ed. Guiry, M.D., John, D.M., Rindi, F. and McCarthy, T.K. 2007. New Survey of Clare Island. Volume 6: The Freshwater and Terrestrial Algae. Royal Irish Academy.

External links
 Microphotographs of desmids

 
Green algae orders